Malach or Malakh may refer to:

 Malach (surname), a common Israeli surname
 Angel (Judaism), malakh is the Hebrew word for messenger in Judaism
 Malachim (Hasidic group)
 Malachim, for the name of the alphabet by Heinrich Cornelius Agrippa
 An Israeli organization of Israeli Sign Language interpreters

People
 Bob Malach (born 1954), American jazz saxophonist
 Chaim Avraham Dov Ber Levine HaCohen (died 1938), known as "the Malach"
 John Malach Shaw (1931–1999), United States federal judge
 Kathleen Malach (1926–2011), All-American Girls Professional Baseball League player
 Lorraine Malach (1933–2003), Canadian ceramic artist

See also
Malak (disambiguation)
 Malachi